Margarita Elena Tapia Fonllem (born 11 April 1959) is a Mexican politician affiliated with the PRD. As of 2013 she served as Deputy of the LXII Legislature of the Mexican Congress representing the Federal District.

References

1959 births
Living people
People from Ciudad Obregón
Politicians from Sonora
Women members of the Chamber of Deputies (Mexico)
Party of the Democratic Revolution politicians
21st-century Mexican politicians
21st-century Mexican women politicians
National Autonomous University of Mexico alumni
Universidad de Sonora alumni
Deputies of the LXII Legislature of Mexico
Members of the Chamber of Deputies (Mexico) for Mexico City